Plainfield School District may refer to:

Plainfield Community Consolidated School District 202, Illinois
Plainfield Public School District, New Jersey

See also
Plainfield Public Schools of Plainfield, Connecticut